Enslaved is the eighth studio album by American heavy metal band Soulfly. It was recorded in fall 2011, mostly in Tallcat Studios in Phoenix, Arizona. Zeuss produced this album. This is the first album to feature Asesino frontman Tony Campos on bass, and the only album to feature former Borknagar drummer David Kinkade on drums, and their last studio album to be released through Roadrunner Records.

Album information
Guests on the album include Dez Fafara of Coal Chamber and DevilDriver on "Redemption of Man by God" and Travis Ryan of Cattle Decapitation on "World Scum", whose vocals were recorded at Frick'In Studios in San Marcos, California. Ryan was brought in to record vocals in place of Adam Warren of Oceano. One song features a guest violinist, among other new styles that they have incorporated into their sound. The album features more death metal influence than their previous releases.

Songs
"World Scum" is the album's only single released on January 25, 2012 with a video released on February 16. The song "Revengeance" features Max Cavalera's sons, and the lyrics are about the murder of his stepson Dana Wells. "Gladiator", leaked online several days before the release of the album, is a melodic song about Roman gladiators. "Plata O Plomo" features Marc Rizzo playing the flamenco guitar, as well as use of Portuguese and Spanish lyrics. "Soulfly VIII" is the first Soulfly song to feature a violin, performed by Tim Sadow.

Reception

The album debuted at number 83 on the Canadian Albums Chart. According to Blabbermouth.net, Enslaved sold 5,900 copies during the first week of its release in the US, thus reaching number 82 on the Billboard 200 chart.

Enslaved received mixed reviews by critics. Then-drummer David Kinkade described the album as "Arise on crack." According to PopMatters, "every song fits into the structure and tone to create a memorable record packed with outstanding content." Q had a negative response because, according to them, world music elements are getting stale. Greg Pratt of Exclaim! wrote that "this album is the band's best yet, as well as the least caught up in "look at this!" eccentricities, adding up to a solid outing, one that never quite gets to death metal, even with blast beats littered throughout. Instead, it's just huge, thick, thrashed-out, aggro-dude metal, but with, like, 20-percent less neon-dread content."

Track listing

Personnel

Soulfly
Max Cavalera – lead vocals, rhythm guitar, sitar
Marc Rizzo – lead guitar, flamenco guitar on "Plata O Plomo"
Tony Campos – bass, vocals on "Plata O Plomo"
David Kinkade – drums, percussion
Additional musicians
Travis Ryan – additional vocals on "World Scum"
Dez Fafara – additional vocals on "Redemption of Man by God"
Richie Cavalera – additional vocals on "Revengeance"
Igor Cavalera Jr. - additional vocals and guitar on "Revengeance"
Zyon Cavalera – drums on "Revengeance"
Tim Sadow – violin on "Soulfly VIII"

Production
Zeuss – production, engineering, mixing, mastering
Dan Frick – additional vocals recording on "World Scum"
Monte Conner – A&R
Management
Gloria Cavalera – management
Christina Stajanovic – assistant
Bryan Roberts – assistant
Artwork
Marcelo Vasco – cover art
Kevin Estrada – photography
Myriam Santos – Max live shot in purple
Leo Zuletta – Soulfly logo

Chart positions

References

External links

Soulfly albums
2012 albums
Roadrunner Records albums
Albums produced by Max Cavalera
Albums produced by Chris "Zeuss" Harris